Hare and Wolf a 1990s Vietnamese series of animated short films directed by M.A. Đặng Nhân Lập.

History
Film based on Soviet series Well, just you wait ! and some Southeast Asian folktales.

Plot
Hare and Wolf lives in the same village. So the series follows the comical adventures of Wolf, trying to catch - and presumably eat or even sell to China - Hare. It features additional characters that usually either help the hare or interfere with the Wolf's plans.
 Episode 01 (1992) : The head and the tails (Cái đầu cái đuôi)
 Episode 02 (1994) : The ears and the eyes (Cái tai cái mắt)
 Episode 03 (1995) : Travelling a day... (Đi một ngày đàng...)
 Episode 04 (2000) : Not to care a fig (Coi trời bằng vung)

Characters
The Hare, commonly called as Hare the Younger, is portrayed as a supposedly positive hero. He is less developed than the Wolf, and most of his actions are simply reactions to the Wolf's schemes. In later episodes, the role of the Hare becomes more active and developed, and he even manages to save the Wolf on several occasions. So the Hare is often mistaken as a female due to his appearance and voice ; however, it seems the Hare is genderless. He is almost always seen wearing the same yellow T-shirt and dark blue shorts unlike the Wolf's ever-varying wardrobe.
The Wolf, commonly called as Wolf the Older, is initially portrayed as a hooligan who eagerly turns to vandalism, abuses minors, breaks laws, and is a smoker (nicotiana rustica) or sometimes drunkard. But he is absolutely henpecked husband.
The Crow, commonly called as Crow the Fellow, is portrayed as a supposedly clown and even philosopher. He always perch on the tree branch to observe and conclude Wolf's behaviors.
Besides as Wolf's wife, Bear the Blacksmith, Fox the Playboy, Chin the Mistress, Cock the Innkeeper and Pup the Police.

Production
 Assistant : Bùi Quỳnh
 Artist : Lý Thu Hà, Lập Thu
 Animators : Lan Phương, Thanh Việt, Tường Long, Nguyễn Thị Măng, Phùng Văn Hà, Ngô Ngọc Long, Hoàng Linh, Doãn Thùy, Thanh Huyền, Minh Nguyệt
 Decorating : Thu Lý, Hồng Sơn, Bình Minh
 Sound : Tạ Quốc Khánh, Mạnh Kiên, Trần Toàn
 Montager : Kim Oanh, Viết Phú
 Actors : Phú Đôn (Wolf), Thùy Dương (Hare), Hương Dung (Wolf's wife), Hoàng Đức Thắng (Crow), Trung Hiếu (Fox & Pup the Police)
 Theme : Going to Perfume Pagoda (Em đi chùa Hương) composed by Trung Đức with Hare's singing, Why you in a hurry to get married (Sao em nỡ vội lấy chồng) composed by Trần Hiếu with Wolf's
 Color printing by National Studio for Documentary and Scientific Films

Culture
Episode 2 was produced by Ministry of Culture and Information's order to encourage a two-child policy.

See also
 Hare and Turtle
 Lu and Bun
 Well, Just You Wait!
 Tom and Jerry

References

1990s animated television series
2000s animated television series
Vietnamese computer-animated films
Vietnamese animated television series
Animated films about rabbits and hares
Animated films about wolves
Animated television series about rabbits and hares
Television series about wolves
Film series based on works